Kind Butler III (born April 8, 1989) is an American track and field athlete who competes in the 400 meters. In 2014, along with teammates David Verburg, Kyle Clemons, and Calvin Smith Jr., he helped set a new world record in the 4x400 meter relay at the IAAF World Indoor Championships in Athletics in Sopot, Poland.

Running Career 
High School

Butler attended Lawrence Central High School. He primarily played baseball and football in high school only joining the track team with three weeks left in his senior year. He would break the school Long Jump record and clear 6'8 in the high jump. Butler jumped 21'11'½  to finish 5th in the Long Jump at the 2007 IHSAA State track meet.

College

Butler went to Kentucky State University where he won the SIAC title in the high jump and broke school records in the long jump, high jump and 200m.

After his freshman year he transferred to Indiana University to be coached by Ron Helmer. While at Indiana he primarily competed in the sprint events. In 2011 he was the Big 10 Indoor 60m champion. In 2012, as a senior, he was the Big 10 Indoor and outdoor champion in the 200m.

Professional 

After his senior season at Indiana, Butler competed in the 2012 USA Championships where he immediately was competitive making the semi-finals in both the 200 meters and the 400 meters. 

In 2014 he made the Team USA indoor 4x400 team and competed at the World Championships in Sopot, Poland. He ran the third leg in 45.41 helping the team wing gold and set a new world record of 3:02.13. The team divided a prize purse of $90,000 -- $40,000 for a gold medal and a $50,000 bonus for the world record. 

While finishing up his professional career he also worked as an assistant track coach at Marian University from 2013-2016.

Race Result Table

Statistics 
Personal bests

References

Living people
1990 births
American male sprinters
African-American male track and field athletes
Indiana Hoosiers men's track and field athletes
World Athletics indoor record holders (relay)
Track and field athletes from Indianapolis
World Athletics Indoor Championships winners
21st-century African-American sportspeople
20th-century African-American people

Track and field athletes from Indiana